Michael DeForest Wilson (born October 20, 1947 in Wilmington, Ohio) is a former American football player who played tackle for the Cincinnati Bengals,  Buffalo Bills and Kansas City Chiefs from 1969 to 1975.

He later played with the Edmonton Eskimos of the Canadian Football League from 1979–1980, where he was an All-Star and won the CFL's Most Outstanding Offensive Lineman Award both seasons. Wilson is the only player to have ever played in the American, the National, the World, the Canadian, and the United States Football League.

Wilson played football at the University of Dayton, where he played both offensive tackle and fullback for the Flyers. He graduated from Dayton in 1970.

Wilson was drafted in the 14th round of the 1969 NFL Draft by the Cincinnati Bengals. After playing three games his rookie season, in 1970 he played in all 14 games, starting 12.

Wilson was inducted into the University of Dayton Athletic Hall of Fame in 1998. He was inducted into the Wilmington High School athletic hall of fame in 2009.

References

1947 births
Living people
People from Wilmington, Ohio
Players of American football from Ohio
American players of Canadian football
American football offensive linemen
Canadian football offensive linemen
Dayton Flyers football players
Cincinnati Bengals players
Buffalo Bills players
Detroit Wheels players
Chicago Winds players
Philadelphia Bell players
Kansas City Chiefs players
Hamilton Tiger-Cats players
Edmonton Elks players
Washington Federals/Orlando Renegades players
Los Angeles Express players
Michigan Panthers players